Petr Kotlařík (born 1 November 1998) is a Czech figure skater. He is the 2023 Czech national Champion. He has competed in the final segment at two ISU Championships.

Personal life 
Petr Kotlařík was born on 1 November 1998 in Jihlava and grew up in Brno, Czech Republic.

Career

Early years 
Kotlařík began learning to skate in 2003. He has trained in both singles and pairs. He teamed up with Natálie Kratěnová around 2011 and skated with her for several years.

2013 to 2015 
Kotlařík debuted on the Junior Grand Prix (JGP) series in October 2013, coached by Eva Horklová and Lucie Kratěnová in Brno and Prague. The following season, he was coached by Karel Fajfr in Brno and Oberstdorf. He was eliminated after the short program at the 2015 World Junior Championships in Tallinn, Estonia.

2015–2016 season 
Kotlařík became the Czech national bronze medalist at the 2016 Four Nationals and made his senior international debut at the Bavarian Open in February 2016. He was coached by Fajfr, Danielle Montalbano, and Rudolf Březina.

2016–2017 season 
Kotlařík was coached by Nikolai Morozov and Florent Amodio in Hackensack, New Jersey. He withdrew from the 2017 Four Nationals. His first senior international title came at the Dragon Trophy in February 2017. In March, he competed at the 2017 World Junior Championships in Taipei, Taiwan; he qualified to the free skate and finished 23rd overall.

2017–2018 season 
In January 2018, Kotlařík won the senior bronze medal at the Bavarian Open. In March, he placed 20th at the 2018 World Junior Championships in Sofia, Bulgaria. He was coached by Florent Amodio in Hackensack, New Jersey, United States, and by Petr Starec in Brno, Czech Republic.

2018–2019 season 
Kotlařík is coached by Amodio in Vaujany and Paris (France), Hackensack (New Jersey, United States), and Brno (Czech Republic).

2022–2023 season 
After a 4-year break due to injury and retirement from skating (2019-2022), Kotlařík is returning to competitive skating. Kotlařík is coached by Brezina Rudolf, Brezina Michal and Josef Sabovcik in Brno (Czech Republic). He won his very first National Title in Senior category.

Programs

Competitive highlights 
CS: Challenger Series; JGP: Junior Grand Prix

Men's singles

Pairs with Kratěnová

References

External links 
 

1998 births
Czech male single skaters
Living people
Sportspeople from Jihlava
Competitors at the 2023 Winter World University Games